Green Leaves may refer to:

Green Leaves, previously known as "Koontz House"
Green Leaves (band), a fictional Japanese boy band known for the song "Yatta"